American Medical Response, Inc. (AMR) is a medical transportation company in the United States that provides and manages community-based medical transportation services, including emergency medical services (or 911), non-emergency and managed transportation, rotary and fixed-wing air ambulance services, and disaster response.

History 
The company was founded in 1991 through the merger of Regional Ambulance (Alameda and Contra Costa counties, CA), Vanguard Ambulance (Santa Clara County, CA), and Buck Ambulance (Portland, OR). It was subsequently acquired by Laidlaw, and sold to Onex in 2004. With this acquisition, Onex formed Emergency Medical Services Corporation (EMSC) by merging AMR with EmCare. In 2011, EMSC was acquired by Clayton, Dubilier & Rice.

On June 12, 2013, EMSC changed its name to Envision Healthcare.

On September 8, 2017, Envision Healthcare announced that AMR would be sold to Kohlberg Kravis Roberts in an all-cash deal worth US$2.4 billion.

In March 2018, AMR became a subsidiary of Global Medical Response.

See also 

 Emergency medical services
 Emergency medical technician
 Paramedic

References

External links 
 
 Global Medical Response

Ambulance services in the United States
Companies based in Greenwood Village, Colorado
Medical and health organizations based in Colorado